The Chile Darwin's frog (Rhinoderma rufum), also called the northern Darwin's frog, is one of only two members of the family Rhinodermatidae. It is endemic to central Chile, although it might well be extinct.

Description
It has a fleshy proboscis, slender limbs and feet webbed between the first and second, and the second and third toes. The dorsal colour is variable but is usually some shade of brown or green, or a mixture of the two. The ventral surface is mottled in black and white.

Biology
The Chile Darwin's frog is diurnal and feeds on small insects and other invertebrates. The female lays a small clutch of eggs on moist ground. About a week later the embryos are beginning to move within the eggs and the male picks them up and stores them in his vocal sac. He keeps them there until they have developed a functioning gut and then transports them to a suitable water body and releases them. The tadpoles grow further in the water and undergo metamorphosis there. This development is in contrast to that of the Darwin's frog (Rhinoderma darwinii) tadpoles which complete their development in their parent's vocal sac.

Distribution and habitat

The Chile Darwin's frog has a very restricted range in central Chile, being found in Talca Province and southwards to Bío Bío Province, between from 33° 30'S to 37° 50'S. Very little is known about this species, but its natural habitats are probably temperate forests, rivers and swamps. The species was sympatric with Rhinoderma darwinii in the region surrounding Concepcion, near the southern extremities of Rhinoderma rufum's distribution.

Conservation status
The Chile Darwin's frog is currently listed as "Critically Endangered" by the IUCN, but as there have been no confirmed sightings since around 1981, it may already be extinct. The main threats it faces are destruction of the pine forests in which it lives and building work but its steep decline is unexplained. It may be the victim of disease such as chytridiomycosis but this had not been reported in Chile when the decline started. If still extant, it is likely to be threatened by habitat loss, pollution, and infection from Batrachochytrium dendrobatidis.

On January 21, 2008, Evolutionarily Distinct and Globally Endangered (EDGE), according to its head, Helen Meredith, identified nature's most weird, wonderful and endangered species: "The EDGE amphibians are amongst the most remarkable and unusual species on the planet and yet an alarming 85% of the top 100 are receiving little or no conservation attention." The top 10 endangered species (in the List of endangered animal species include: the Chinese giant salamander (Andrias davidianus), a relative of the hellbender (Cryptobranchus alleganiensus); the tiny Gardiner's Seychelles frog (Sooglossus gardineri); the limbless Sagalla caecilian (Boulengerula niedeni); the Table Mountain ghost frog (Heleophryne rosei); the Mexican lungless salamanders; the Malagasy rainbow frog (Scaphiophryne gottlebei); the Chile Darwin's frog (Rhinoderma rufum); and the Betic midwife toad (Alytes dickhilleni).

See also
Gastric-brooding frog
Mouthbrooder

References

External links

Rhinodermatidae
Amphibians of Chile
Endemic fauna of Chile
Taxa named by Rodolfo Amando Philippi
Amphibians described in 1902
EDGE species
Taxonomy articles created by Polbot